Triisobutylaluminium (TiBA) is an organoaluminium compound with the formula Al(CH2CH(CH3)2)3.  This colorless pyrophoric liquid is mainly used to make linear primary alcohols and α-olefins.

Structure
Triisobutylaluminium exists in equilibrium with its dimer. The equilibrium constant, KD, is 3.810 at 20 °C.
 2Al(CH2CH(CH3)2)3   [Al(CH2CH(CH3)2)3]2
In the dimer, the bridging carbon-aluminium bond is elongated and exhibits evidence of restricted rotation. For the sake of simplicity, TiBA is written as the monomer in this article.

Synthesis
Trialkylaluminium compounds are available industrially through the reactions of aluminium powder, hydrogen gas, and the desired alkenes. The synthesis of TiBA requires two steps; the first step produces diisobutylaluminium hydride (written as a monomer):
6CH2=C(CH3)2 + 2Al + 3H2 → 6HAl(CH2CH(CH3)2)2
In the second step isobutylene adds to the diisobutylaluminium to give TiBA:
CH2=C(CH3)2 + HAl(CH2CH(CH3)2)2  →  Al(CH2CH(CH3)2)3

Reactions
α-olefins are readily eliminated from β-branched trialkylaluminium compounds. Trialkylaluminium compounds are used in the industrial production of polymers. In the most common of these compounds, TIBA, a substantial level of Al – H bonds are present at equilibrium. The greater stability of unbranched trialkylaluminium compounds relative to branched trialkylaluminium compounds in TIBA forms the basis for a general synthesis of triethyl- and higher linear trialkylaluminium materials from triisobutylaluminium.

Al(CH2CH(CH3)2)3 + 3RCH=CH2  →  Al(CH2CH2R)3 + 3CH2=C(CH3)2

Safety
Like most organoaluminium compounds, TiBA reacts violently with water and air.

References

Further reading
Keisuke Suzuki, Tetsuya Nagasaws, Encyclopedia of Reagents for Organic Synthesis, Triisobutylaluminum, 2009

Organoaluminium compounds